Pope Peter may refer to:

Saint Peter, regarded by the Christian tradition to be the first bishop of Rome
Pope Peter I of Alexandria, Pope of Alexandria 300–311
Pope Peter II of Alexandria, 373–380
Pope Peter III of Alexandria, 477–490
Pope Peter IV of Alexandria, 565–569
Pope Peter V of Alexandria, 1340–1348
Pope Peter VI of Alexandria, 1718–1726
Pope Peter VII of Alexandria, 1809–1852

Others

Manuel Alonso Corral, or Pope Peter II of the schismatic Palmarian Catholic Church from 2005 to 2011 
Joseph Odermatt, or Pope Peter III of the schismatic Palmarian Catholic Church, the incumbent pope since 2016

See also
Peter Pope (disambiguation)
Pope Peter II (disambiguation)
List of Greek Orthodox Patriarchs of Alexandria